Yero may refer to:

 Yero, a name, in multiple cultures and languages, used as a surname and given name
 Vicia ervilia, a Mediterranean grain legume crop also called 'yero'
 Gyro (food) also spelled as "yero" and "yeros"
 Year End Roll Over (YERO), a type of integer overflow or counter reset in data systems and calendrical systems

See also
 Dimitris Yeros (born 1948) Greek artist
 Giro (disambiguation)
 Gyro (disambiguation)